During the 1996–97 English football season, Notts County F.C. competed in the Football League Second Division.

Season summary
In the 1996–97 season, it was a disaster for Murphy and the club, with a series of heavy defeats that eventually led to his sacking on 23 December 1996. On 16 January 1997, Sam Allardyce made his return to football as manager but he arrived too late to save them from relegation.

Final league table

 Pld = Matches ; W = Matches won; D = Matches drawn; L = Matches lost; F = Goals for; A = Goals against; GD = Goal difference; Pts = Points
 NB: In the Football League goals scored (F) takes precedence over goal difference (GD).

Results
Notts County's score comes first

Legend

Football League Second Division

FA Cup

League Cup

Football League Trophy

Squad

References

Notts County F.C. seasons
Notts County